The ancient Egyptian Mast hieroglyph is one of the oldest language hieroglyphs from Ancient Egypt. It is used on a famous label of Pharaoh Den of the First dynasty, but forms part of the location hieroglyph: Emblem of the East.

Nectanebo II's obelisk uses the Mast hieroglyph when describing the construction of his obelisk; in a S-Egyptian emphatic word construct he adds a vertical S, the folded cloth, Gardiner no. S29, S29, at the beginning of the word "to erect". (see here, high res: ,)

The Ship's Mast hieroglyph is used as a triliteral phonetic hieroglyphic to represent the sound sequence ꜥḥꜥ, which means "to stand erect", or "to stand vertical"; its use is extensive throughout the language history, and hieroglyphic tomb reliefs and story-telling of Ancient Egypt. It is possibly a forerunner hieroglyph kh3 , the sun rising upon the horizon.

In the 198 BC Rosetta Stone, the ship's mast hieroglyph has the unique usage in the final line of the Ptolemy V decree: the mast is used twice-(adjective, verb):
engrave the decree..: "...upon a vertical-(mast) stone stele"..in the 3-language scripts, .."Shall be made to stand it in the sanctuaries in temples all..."

See also

Gardiner's Sign List#P. Ships and Parts of Ships
Gardiner's Sign List#U. Agriculture, Crafts, and Professions
List of Egyptian hieroglyphs by common name: M-Z
 Mast

References
Budge.  An Egyptian Hieroglyphic Dictionary, E.A.Wallace Budge, (Dover Publications), c 1978, (c 1920), Dover edition, 1978. (In two volumes) (softcover)
Budge.  The Rosetta Stone,'' E.A.Wallace Budge, (Dover Publications), c 1929, Dover edition(unabridged), 1989. (softcover)

Egyptian hieroglyphs: arts and trades
Egyptian hieroglyphs: ships and parts of ships